Trampolino Gigante Corno d'Aola is an abandoned K90 ski jumping hill in Ponte di Legno, Italy opened in 1929.

History
In 1928, hill located at 1258 meters above sea and designed by Adolf Badrutt, a Swiss ski jumper and world record holder, in the last town of the Val Camonica valley was completed.

On 24 February 1929, hill was officially opened in front of 20,000 spectators by Edda Mussolini, mother of Italian prime minister Benito Mussolini. The participants had exceptional prizes, given the period, this was possible thanks to the sponsors of that time: large companies and paramilitary organizations.

On 16 February 1930, Ernesto Zardini from Kingdom of Italy fell at world record distance at 76 metres (249 feet).

In 1931, late January or early February, Polish ski jumper Bronisław Czech fell at 79.5 metres (261 ft) world record distance, although some judges recognized it as official, never internationally recognized.

On 17 March 1935, Swiss Fritz Kainersdörfer jumped 99.5 meters (326 ft) and set the only official world record on this hill. Later that day history was made, when Olav Ulland from Norway fell at 103.5 metres (340 ft) and became first man ever to beat one hundred meter mark in ski jumping, although it was invalid and didn't count as he should be standing for record to be officially recognized.

In March 1936, shortly after Bradl's historic WR jump, Bruno Da Col jumped 100.5 metres and set first ever jump in Italy over hundred meters for which he received a golden medal of honour by Benito Mussolini.

The hill attracted many visitors each year from all over Europe. After the war, when it was enlarged and renamed as Gigante (Giant), interest for this sport in Italy rapidly diminished. 

On 16 February 1949, at the Italian National Championships, Bruno Da Col set the all-time official hill record at 110.5 metres (363 feet), tied years later at the last hill competition.

On 14 February 1966 hill hosted the last competition, famous Kongsberg Cup, where an official hill record was set and tied by West German Henrik Ohlmeyer who jumped 110.5 meters (363 ft). Italian ski jumper Giacomo Aimoni claimed that he jumped 114 meters (374 ft) at training, but this jump was never officially recognized as hill record.

Ski jumping world records

The first jump in history over 100 meters (although with fall) was set by Olav Ulland here in 1935.

 Not recognized! Fall at world record distance.

References

External links
Trampolino Gigante Corno d'Aola (Trampolino del Littorio) skisprungschanzen.com

Ski jumping venues in Italy